Sardar Abdur Rashid Khan (1906 — 1995) was a senior police officer from the Khyber-Pakhtunkhwa province and cabinet minister in Pakistan.

Born in Dera Ismail Khan, Sardar Rashid was educated at Islamia College Peshawar. He then joined the Indian Police (IP) and was serving as the Deputy Superintendent of Police in Peshawar City when Pakistan became an independent country on August 14, 1947. He was one of the senior most police officers in the newly-emergent country.

Sardar Rashid rose to become the Inspector General of Khyber Pakhtunkhwa Police, but resigned from the police service on April 23, 1953, when he was appointed as the 8th Chief Minister of Khyber-Pakhtunkhwa. His nomination was controversial in that he was handpicked by his predecessor Abdul Qayyum Khan. However, he proved to be a popular choice, and in November 1953, he was elected as the provincial president of the Muslim League despite the efforts of Abdul Qayyum Khan to retain the post for himself following his elevation to the Central Government.

He remained Chief Minister until  July 18, 1955, when he was forced to resign because of his opposition to the ""One Unit Scheme"". He was succeeded by Sardar Bahadur Khan (older brother of General Ayub Khan) who secured approval from the provincial assembly for the controversial scheme.

Sardar Rashid joined the Republican Party and was elected as a Member of the West Pakistan Assembly when the ""One Unit Scheme"" came into effect, and served in the cabinet of Dr Khan Sahib initially as Minister for Health and later as Minister for Finance and Information.

On the resignation of Dr Khan Sahib in July 1957, Sardar Rashid was elected as the second Chief Minister of West Pakistan. He resigned from this position on March 18, 1958, and was succeeded by Nawab Muzaffar Ali Khan Qizilbash.

Sardar Rashid (Republican) served as Minister for Commerce and Industries in the cabinet of Prime Minister Sir Feroz Khan Noon (Republican) from March 29, 1958 - October 7, 1958, when the cabinet was dismissed on the declaration of Martial Law by President Iskander Mirza.

After the fall of the Ayub Khan government, Sardar Abdur Rashid served as Minister for Home Affairs (Interior), Kashmir Affairs, States, and Frontier Regions in the presidential cabinet of President and Chief Martial Law Administrator General Yahya Khan from August 4, 1969 - February 22, 1971.

1906 births
1995 deaths
Chief Ministers of Khyber Pakhtunkhwa
Interior ministers of Pakistan
Pakistani police officers
Pakistani republicans
Pashtun people
Chief Ministers of West Pakistan